The International Journal of Sustainable Energy Planning and Management is a quarterly peer-reviewed open-access academic journal covering all aspects of sustainability studies. The journal was established in 2014 and is published by Aalborg University Press. The editor-in-chief is Poul Alberg Østergaard (Aalborg University). The journal has no article processing charges.

Abstracting and indexing
The journal is abstracted and indexed in Ei Compendex and Scopus.

References

External links

Engineering journals
Publications established in 2014
English-language journals
Aalborg University
Creative Commons Attribution-licensed journals
Continuous journals